Ronnie Powell (born November 3, 1974) is a former American football wide receiver who played for the Cleveland Browns of the National Football League (NFL). He played college football at Northwestern State University. He was a kick returner for the Browns in their 1999 season, playing 14 games and returning 44 balls for 986 yards, fumbling 3 of them. In Week 14, he logged his first and only NFL reception of 45 yards, but in a later kickoff return, he fumbled the ball and sprained his neck, and was out the rest of the season. He was waived in the next preseason.

References 

Living people
1974 births
American football wide receivers
Northwestern State Demons football players
Cleveland Browns players
People from Hope, Arkansas
Players of American football from Arkansas